The following is a list of football stadiums in Serbia, in order by capacity. The capacities listed are seating capacities, which means the potential number of spectators the stadiums can accommodate in non-seated stands are not listed. The minimum capacity is 2,000.

Current stadiums

Stadiums under countruction

Proposed stadiums

See also
List of association football stadiums by capacity
List of stadiums in Europe
List of European stadiums by capacity

References 

 
Serbia
stadiums
Football stadiums